The Austrian Federal Computing Centre or Bundesrechenzentrum (BRZ) is a public information technology (IT) service provider based in Vienna. The organisation develops and operates e-government services for the Austrian Federal Government, including the Federal Ministries and the Federal Chancellery. In 1997 the BRZ was outsourced from the Ministry of Finance as an organisational spin-off on the basis of a Federal Law, since then it acts as a limited liability company. The Austrian Federal Computing Centre is owned by the Republic of Austria, represented by the Ministry of Finance.

Business area 
The BRZ owns one of the largest data centres in the country, provides infrastructure and supervises more than 30,000 IT work stations. Its core market consists of the ministries, the Chancellery, supreme authorities, universities and outsourced organizations. As a full service provider the BRZ offers solutions and services along the entire IT value chain – from product management to the development and implementation of individual and standard software to secure operation.

Among the best known e-government applications are FinanzOnline, JustizOnline, oesterreich.gv.at, federal budget accounting and personnel management, Electronic customs application service (eCustoms), Business Service Portal (usp.gv.at), Commercial and Land Register, Austrian Federal electronic filing system (ELAK), Austrian open data catalogue (data.gv.at), student union elections (E-Voting), Biometric passport, Austrian Health Portal (gesundheit.gv.at) and Austrian personalised access portal (portal.at).

International 
The BRZ is involved in EU-wide projects and collaborations, such as Euritas (European Alliance of Public IT Service Providers), Cloud4Europe (Cloud Computing in Europe), PEPPOL  (Pan-European Public Procurement Online), STORK (Secure Identity Across Borders Linked) and eCodex (European e-justice system).

Sources 
 Company report 2013 of the Austrian Federal Computing Centre

External links 
 Website of the Austrian Federal Computing Centre
 USP
 Austrian Health Portal
 DATA.gv.at

Information technology in Austria